Victor Raul Anchante Licht (born August 26, 1979, in Lima, Perú) is a Peruvian footballer who plays as defender. He currently plays for Sporting Cristal.

Profile
Víctor Anchante started his professional playing career in Sporting Cristal (2000–2001), after that he played in Sport Coopsol from Trujillo two years more(2002–2003).In 2004, he joined to Universidad San Martin de Porres USMP in the first year of this team in the professional level, so he is one of the "founders" of this team. During the next two years he played in Club Coronel Bolognesi from Tacna (2005–2006). Finally he returned to his home, Club Sporting Cristal S.A. (2007–2009).

References

1979 births
Living people
Footballers from Lima
Association football defenders
Peruvian footballers
Sport Coopsol Trujillo footballers
Sporting Cristal footballers
Club Deportivo Universidad de San Martín de Porres players
Coronel Bolognesi footballers